Lovci may refer to:

 Lovci (Kruševac), a village in Serbia
 Lovci (Jagodina), a village in Serbia